The Orca carbon capture plant is a facility that uses direct air capture to remove carbon dioxide from the atmosphere. It was constructed by Climeworks and is joint work with Carbfix, an academic-industrial partnership that has developed a novel approach to capture . The plant uses dozens of large fans to pull in air and pass it through a filter. The filter is then released of the  it contains through heat. The  extracted is later mixed with water and pushed into the ground, using a technology from Carbfix.

The plant started sequestering carbon dioxide in 2021. It is said to have cost between $10–15 million to build. It is located in Iceland and is the largest facility of its kind on earth. It is located about 50 kilometers outside Reykjavík next to the Hellisheiði Power Station, which is run by Reykjavík Energy.  It was inaugurated on 8 September 2021 in presence of Katrín Jakobsdóttir, the Prime Minister of Iceland.

Carbon offsetting potential 
This equates roughly to the emissions from about 870 cars. It counts Microsoft founder Bill Gates and the reinsurance company Swiss Re as current customers.

References

Carbon capture and storage
Buildings and structures in Iceland